Percy Jabez Salmon (20 October 1885 – 24 September 1963) was an Australian rules footballer who played with Geelong in the Victorian Football League (VFL).

Notes

External links 

1885 births
1963 deaths
Australian rules footballers from Victoria (Australia)
Geelong Football Club players